Farmers National Weekly was an  English-language Communist farm newspaper published in the United States. It was published by either the Farmers' National Education Association or the Farmers National Committee for Action (a Communist organization) in 1933 in Washington, D.C., and from 1934 to 1936 in Chicago.

References

1933 establishments in Washington, D.C.
1936 disestablishments in Illinois
Communist periodicals published in the United States
Defunct newspapers published in Chicago
Defunct newspapers published in Washington, D.C.
Publications established in 1933
Publications disestablished in 1936